Air Vice Marshal Conway Walter Heath Pulford,  (26 January 1892 – 10 March 1942) was a senior Royal Air Force officer during World War II. Pulford commanded British forces in the Japanese invasion of Malaya and the subsequent fall of Singapore.

Pulford died of exhaustion and malaria after his evacuation vessel was attacked by Japanese aircraft and ran aground on an uninhabited island.

Early life
Pulford was born in Agra, India the son of Russell Richard and Lucy Anne Pulford.

Naval career
Pulford began his career in the Royal Navy in 1905 as a Naval Cadet at the Royal Naval College, Osborne.

RAF career
In January 1920, Pulford left the Navy for the Royal Air Force, becoming a squadron commander in 1921.  Pulford attended the RAF Staff College in 1922 and the Imperial Defence College in 1929.

Second World War

In 1941 he attempted to build up the RAF in the Far East to support all the forces under the Far East Command. But before the Japanese attacked on 8 December 1941, the Far East was given a low priority, so little was done. To bolster his very small staff now that the war had started, Air Vice Marshal Paul Maltby arrived and undertook duties as his deputy. Pulford was authorised to evacuate himself on 5 February 1942. Ten days later Pulford and his naval counterpart, Rear Admiral Ernest Spooner, were amongst the last to leave. Their vessel, the Royal Navy ML 310, was attacked by Japanese aircraft and forced to run aground on a malaria-ridden island called Chibia (Tjibia, Tjebia), part of the Juju group located north of Bangka Island, Indonesia, and was uninhabited.  The survivors managed to hold out for two months before being forced to surrender to the Japanese, but the Air Vice Marshal and Rear Admiral had both died of exhaustion and malaria. When Pulford did not arrive in Java, Maltby took over command of RAF Far East Command, but was captured and spent the rest of the war as a prisoner of war of the Japanese.

Notes

References

1892 births
1942 deaths
Royal Air Force air marshals of World War II
Military of Singapore under British rule
Companions of the Order of the Bath
Officers of the Order of the British Empire
Recipients of the Air Force Cross (United Kingdom)
Royal Naval Air Service aviators
People educated at the Royal Naval College, Osborne
Graduates of the Royal College of Defence Studies
Royal Air Force personnel killed in World War II
Burials at Kranji War Cemetery
Military personnel of British India
British people in colonial India